The Government Museum, Chennai, or the Madras Museum, is a museum of human history and culture located in the Government Museum Complex in the neighbourhood of Egmore in Chennai, India. Started in 1851, it is the second oldest museum in India after the Indian Museum in Kolkata. It is particularly rich in archaeological and numismatic collections. It has the largest collection of Roman antiquities outside Europe. Among them, the colossal Museum Theatre is one of the most impressive. The National Art Gallery is also present in the museum premises. Built in Indo-Saracenic style, it houses rare European and Asian painting of renowned artists, including that of Raja Ravi Varma. It had 0.6 million visitors in 2018. It has the richest collections of bronze idols, 500 of them dating to 1000 BCE, in Asia.

Location
The museum is located in what is known as the Pantheon complex, or "public assembly rooms." It is located in the Government Museum Complex on Pantheon Road in Egmore. The road on which the museum is located too takes its name from the complex. The Government Museum Complex also houses the Connemara Public Library and the National Art Gallery.

History

In August 1778, the governor of Madras granted 43 acres for an estate to a civil servant, who, subsequently in 1793, assigned the grounds to a committee of 24 which then regulated the public amusements in the city. In 1821, the committee sold the main house and central garden space to E. S. Moorat, an Armenian merchant who, in turn, sold it back to the government in 1830. The government first used the buildings and the grounds as the collector's "Cutcherry" and later for the "Central Museum." The museum was originally established in a building on College Road in Nungambakkam in the year 1851 and was shifted to the present site in 1854.

Many additions to the original building were constructed between 1864 and 1890. The core of the old museum building includes the only surviving remnants of the Pantheon, identified from the broad steps leading into it when viewed from the north. Amongst the additions is the Connemara Public Library, built with stained glass windows, ornate woodwork and elaborate stucco decorations, formally opened in 1896 and named after its progenitor. The building was built by Namberumal Chetty and was designed by Henry Irwin, with the interiors resembling those of Bank of Madras (SBI). The design included a huge reading room with a wooden ceiling between two curved rows of stained glass, supported by ornate pillars and arches embellished with sculpted acanthus leaves. It was supplemented with teakwood furniture, marbled floor, and decorative windows. All of these were restored in 2004–2007. The building now houses the Old Collection (pre-1930), which is used for reference purpose only.

Both the museum and the library benefited greatly from the effects of the Madras Literary Society, the Oriental Manuscripts Library and the Records Office. The museum houses a 19th-century theatre, with the "pit" meant for those who can afford more and seating for the rest of the audience in tiered-seats arranged in a semi-circle around the pit. Restoration to mark the 150th anniversary of the museum replaced 25 fans with air-conditioning.

The museum's collections had its origin from a gift of a collection of 1,100 geological specimens by the Madras Literary Society to the Government in 1851. The museum, the first government-sponsored one in the country, opened the same year on the first floor of the College of Fort St. George, adjacent to the Literary Society in Nungambakkam, with an exhibit of nearly 20,000 freely gifted specimens ranging from rocks to books. These gifts were in response to a public invitation that did not have a cut-off date. When the mounting collection of geological specimens threatened the stability of this first floor, the museum's first officer-in-charge, Surgeon Edward Balfour, who was then president of the Literary Society and serving the museum in an honorary capacity, suggested moving to a new building, which was materialised in 1854 with the move to the Pantheon. A library and a reading room were provided for the public in 1859. In 1864, an upper storey was added to the Pantheon in sympathetic style, giving the museum more elbow room. The library got a new block, now known as the centenary exhibition hall of the museum after restoration, in the northwest corner of the Pantheon in 1876, with a lecture hall. By 1896, there had been built new buildings for the museum (where the anthropological and arms galleries are presently located), the Connemara Library and the museum theatre.

The museum grounds also housed the first zoo of Madras in 1855, which was also established by Balfour. A year later, it had over 300 animals, including mammals, birds and reptiles. The zoo was later made a separate institution and was shifted to the People's Park in 1863 where it remained, not growing very much, until it was moved to its present location at Vandalur in 1985.

An official website for the museum was launched on 25 October 2001 after the government sanctioned  0.5 million in 2000–2001.

List of superintendents/directors/commissioners

The museum complex 

The museum complex consisting of six buildings and 46 galleries covers an area of around 16.25 acres (66,000 m2) of land. The objects displayed in the museum cover a variety of artifacts and objects covering diverse fields including archeology, numismatics, zoology, natural history, sculptures, palm-leaf manuscripts, and Amravati paintings.

Located close to the main museum entrance gates on Pantheon Road, the museum theatre is a rare specimen of the Italianate style of architecture, inspired by Classical architecture and developed in 1802 at Britain by John Nash. However, the theatre was built by the British in the late 19th century when this style was no longer popular in England. The structure has a high plinth and is accessed through a tall flight of stairs. It is primarily a semicircular structure with a rectangular wing at the rear. The latter wing now houses some of the galleries of the museum. The main hall is accessed through a verandah with a row of columns linked by semicircular arches. The walls and columns are embellished with floral and geometric designs.

The huge main hall was initially designed for staging theatrical performances. It has around 600 seats and a commodious stage and the actors' dressing rooms adjoin this stage.

During the British era, the theatre was mainly used for staging English plays preferred by the British elite of the city. Now, the museum has been using the theatre for its own cultural and academic programs such as art workshops, lectures and conferences. It also rents the hall for various cultural performances, mainly dramas. The hall has witnessed several plays including those of Shakespeare.

Since August 2004, the museum is also a designated "Manuscript Conservation Centre" (MCC) under the National Mission for Manuscripts established in 2003. The museum has taken preventive care of about 19,007 manuscripts and given curative conservation treatment to about 7,402 manuscripts.

The museum for children in the complex houses several static exhibits such as galleries of dolls adorned with costumes of various nations and civilisations and also exhibits pertaining to science, transportation, and technology.

Visitors
As of 2013, the children's museum is visited by 1,000 people a day, and the number of visitors increases during weekends.

The future
 
An air-conditioned 3D theatre, the first of its kind facility in a state museum, is under construction at the children's museum in the museum complex at a cost of  4 million. Equipments are to be provided by the National Council of Science Museums, Kolkata. The theatre will screen science-oriented films. It screen a 20-minute-long film and will play five shows a day. The project is expected to be completed by April 2013. There are also plans to upgrade the 3D theatre to a 5D one.

In 2018, the Department of Museums started evaluating bids for renovating the museum as part of an Asian Development Bank–funded scheme.

Gallery

See also

 Cuddalore Government Museum
 Government Museum, Karur
 Government Museum, Pudukkottai
 Government Museum, Tiruchirappalli
 Connemara Public Library
 Museum of Possibilities
 Tamil Nadu Police Museum
 List of Tamil Nadu Government Estates, Complexes, Buildings and Structures
 Heritage structures in Chennai

References

External links

Official website

State museums in India
Museums in Chennai
Natural history museums in India
Numismatic museums in India
Art museums and galleries in India
Archaeological museums in India
Museums established in 1851
1851 establishments in India
1851 establishments in British India
British colonial architecture in India
Indo-Saracenic Revival architecture
Heritage sites in Chennai
Italianate architecture in India